Joaquín "Chito" Cuerva Loyzaga (born August 29, 1958) is a Filipino former professional basketball player and basketball commissioner. He is currently the Athletics Director of the NU Bulldogs in the University Athletic Association of the Philippines. He played for the San Beda College in the NCAA before going on to play in the Philippine Basketball Association.

PBA career

In the PBA, Loyzaga played one game for YCO-Tanduay, then migrated to Australia for two years. He came back to play for  
Toyota in 1983. After Toyota disbanded, Loyzaga moved to Great Taste, where he became part of the team's dynasty of four straight championships.  In 1986, he was shipped to Ginebra San Miguel, where he spent all of his last eight seasons in the PBA, winning three championships.  A seven-time recipient of the Philippine Basketball Association All-Defensive Team award from 1985 to 1992, Loyzaga made a name for himself as a straight-up defensive stopper, using his heft and quick hands to guard the league's best big men, including the great Ramon Fernandez, and later, Alvin Patrimonio. 

He retired from basketball after the 1993 PBA season.

National team career

Loyzaga also played for the Philippines men's national basketball team in the 1990 Asian Games where he distinguished himself by helping limit North Korean center Ri Myung Hun despite a height discrepancy of over a foot and a half between them.

Personal life

Loyzaga is the son of Philippine basketball great Carlos Loyzaga and Vicky Cuerva. He and brother Joey Loyzaga became one of the few siblings to play in the PBA, eventually playing with Ginebra San Miguel. 

He is married to Ma. Antonia “Toni” Yulo, with whom he has three children, namely: Celina, Jose Joaquin, and Cecilia. Yulo was executive director of the Manila Observatory from 2007 to 2016, and former president of National Resilience Council. In July 2022, Bongbong Marcos appointed her as secretary of the Department of Environment and Natural Resources.

In 2002, Loyzaga became the fourth commissioner of the Metropolitan Basketball Association. He was also a commissioner and executive director of the Philippine Sports Commission from 2010 to 2012.

In 2013, he served as a basketball commissioner in the 76th Season of the UAAP.

Recently, on April 9, 2015,  he was appointed the Athletics Director of the National University for their Bulldogs sports program, replacing Junel Baculi.

References

Living people
1958 births
Barangay Ginebra San Miguel players
Filipino people of Basque descent
Filipino people of Spanish descent
Metropolitan Basketball Association executives
Philippines men's national basketball team players
Filipino men's basketball players
San Beda Red Lions basketball players
Power forwards (basketball)
Small forwards
Asian Games medalists in basketball
Basketball players at the 1990 Asian Games
Basketball players from Manila
Toyota Super Corollas players
Tanduay Rhum Masters players
Great Taste Coffee Makers players
Asian Games silver medalists for the Philippines
Medalists at the 1990 Asian Games